was a Japanese sprinter. He competed at the 1960 and 1964 Summer Olympics.

References

1940 births
2012 deaths
Sportspeople from Aichi Prefecture
Japanese male sprinters
Olympic male sprinters
Olympic athletes of Japan
Athletes (track and field) at the 1960 Summer Olympics
Athletes (track and field) at the 1964 Summer Olympics
Asian Games bronze medalists for Japan
Asian Games medalists in athletics (track and field)
Athletes (track and field) at the 1962 Asian Games
Medalists at the 1962 Asian Games
Japan Championships in Athletics winners
Universiade medalists in athletics (track and field)
Universiade silver medalists for Japan
Medalists at the 1961 Summer Universiade